Nomisia is a genus of ground spiders that was first described by R. de Dalmas in 1921.

Species
 it contains thirty-nine species:
Nomisia aussereri (L. Koch, 1872) – Mediterranean, Eastern Europe, Turkey, Middle East, Caucasus, Russia (Europe to South Siberia), Kazakhstan, Central Asia, China
Nomisia australis Dalmas, 1921 – South Africa
Nomisia castanea Dalmas, 1921 – Algeria, Tunisia, Libya
Nomisia celerrima (Simon, 1914) – Spain, France
Nomisia chordivulvata (Strand, 1906) – Ethiopia, Somalia
Nomisia conigera (Spassky, 1941) – Turkey, Caucasus, Kazakhstan, Central Asia
Nomisia dalmasi Lessert, 1929 – Congo
Nomisia excerpta (O. Pickard-Cambridge, 1872) – Canary Is. to Middle East
Nomisia exornata (C. L. Koch, 1839) (type) – Europe to Central Asia
Nomisia flavimana Denis, 1937 – Algeria
Nomisia fortis Dalmas, 1921 – Canary Is.
Nomisia frenata (Purcell, 1908) – South Africa
Nomisia gomerensis Wunderlich, 2011 – Canary Is.
Nomisia graciliembolus Wunderlich, 2011 – Canary Is.
Nomisia harpax (O. Pickard-Cambridge, 1874) – India
Nomisia kabuliana Roewer, 1961 – Afghanistan
Nomisia levyi Chatzaki, 2010 – Greece
Nomisia molendinaria (L. Koch, 1866) – Croatia, Georgia
Nomisia monardi Lessert, 1933 – Angola
Nomisia montenegrina Giltay, 1932 – Montenegro
Nomisia musiva (Simon, 1889) – Canary Is.
Nomisia negebensis Levy, 1995 – Turkey, Israel, Iran
Nomisia notia Dalmas, 1921 – South Africa
Nomisia orientalis Dalmas, 1921 – Turkey
Nomisia palaestina (O. Pickard-Cambridge, 1872) – Greece, Turkey, Syria, Israel
Nomisia peloponnesiaca Chatzaki, 2010 – Greece
Nomisia perpusilla Dalmas, 1921 – Spain
Nomisia poecilipes Caporiacco, 1939 – Ethiopia
Nomisia punctata (Kulczyński, 1901) – Ethiopia
Nomisia recepta (Pavesi, 1880) – Tunisia, Algeria, France (mainland, Corsica), Italy (mainland, Sicily), Malta, Cyprus
Nomisia ripariensis (O. Pickard-Cambridge, 1872) – Bulgaria, Greece, Crete, Turkey to Azerbaijan
Nomisia satulla (Simon, 1909) – Ethiopia
Nomisia scioana (Pavesi, 1883) – Ethiopia
Nomisia simplex (Kulczyński, 1901) – Ethiopia
Nomisia tingitana Dalmas, 1921 – Morocco
Nomisia transvaalica Dalmas, 1921 – South Africa
Nomisia tubula (Tucker, 1923) – Angola, South Africa
Nomisia uncinata Jézéquel, 1965 – Ivory Coast
Nomisia varia (Tucker, 1923) – South Africa

References

Araneomorphae genera
Gnaphosidae